is a railway station located in the city of Murayama, Yamagata Prefecture, Japan, operated by the East Japan Railway Company (JR East).

Lines
Sodesaki Station is served by the Ōu Main Line, and is located 121.5 rail kilometers from the terminus of the line at Fukushima Station.

Station layout
The station has one island platform connected to the station building by a footbridge. The station is unattended.

Platforms

History
Sodesaki Station opened as a signal stop on April 1, 1912. It became a full passenger station on November 10, 1918. The station was absorbed into the JR East network upon the privatization of the JNR on April 1, 1987.

Surrounding area
Sodesaki Post Office

See also
List of railway stations in Japan

External links

 JR East Station information 

Railway stations in Japan opened in 1918
Railway stations in Yamagata Prefecture
Ōu Main Line
Murayama, Yamagata